Ulianivske is a village in Amvrosiivka (district) in Donetsk Oblast of eastern Ukraine.

Demographics
Native language as of the Ukrainian Census of 2001:
 Ukrainian 50.41%
 Russian 49.36%
 Belarusian 0.23%

References

Villages in Donetsk Raion